American Pluck is a 1925 American silent action comedy film directed by Richard Stanton. American Pluck was Stanton's last film. It stars George Walsh and Wanda Hawley. It was produced by I. E. Chadwick Productions and distributed by Film Booking Offices of America.

Plot
As described in a film magazine reviews, Blaze Derringer is expelled from college for his wild exploits. His father casts him out, advising him not to return unless he has earned $5,000 by his own efforts within a year. He engages in a prize fight and again meets the girl he had previously rescued from a cabaret fight. She is Princess Alicia of Bargonia and he returns to her country with her. There he thwarts Count Verensky, who has plotted to win her throne. Blaze rescues her from her abductors and wins a wife and a throne.

Cast

Preservation
A print of American Pluck survives in a private collection.

References

External links 

1920s action comedy films
American action comedy films
American silent feature films
Films set in Europe
American black-and-white films
Surviving American silent films
1925 comedy films
1925 films
1920s American films
Silent American comedy films
Silent action comedy films